Alan Cooke Kay (born July 5, 1932) is a senior United States district judge of the United States District Court for the District of Hawaii.

Education and career

Born on July 5, 1932, in Honolulu, Hawaii, Kay attended Princeton University, where he received an Artium Baccalaureus degree in 1957 and the UC Berkeley School of Law where he received a Bachelor of Laws in 1960. He served as a United States Marine Corps Corporal from 1953 to 1955. He was in private practice in Honolulu from 1960 to 1986, and was director of the Legal Aid Society in Honolulu from 1968 to 1971.

Federal judicial service

Kay was nominated by Ronald Reagan on July 3, 1986, to a new seat created by 98 Stat. 333 on the United States District Court for the District of Hawaii. He was confirmed by the United States Senate on September 12, 1986, and received his commission on September 15, 1986. He served as Chief Judge from 1991 to 1999 and assumed senior status on January 2, 2000.

Relations and family tree

Kay's father was Harold Thomas Kay (1896–1976) and mother was Anna Frances Cooke (1903–1956). His maternal grandfather was Clarence Hyde Cooke (1876–1944), great grandparents Anna Rice Cooke (1853–1934) and Charles Montague Cooke (1849–1909), and great-great grandfathers include William Harrison Rice  (1813–1863) and Amos Starr Cooke (1810–1871). He had two children from his first wife Noel Emily Murchie, and one from his second wife Patricia Eileen Patmont.

References

External links 

1932 births
Living people
People from Honolulu
Military personnel from Hawaii
Princeton University alumni
UC Berkeley School of Law alumni
Judges of the United States District Court for the District of Hawaii
United States district court judges appointed by Ronald Reagan
20th-century American judges
United States Marines
21st-century American judges